"Welcome" is a song by American hip hop artist Erick Sermon recorded for his second album Double or Nothing (1995). The song, which features Sermon's fellow Def Squad member Keith Murray, was released as the second and final single for the album on January 23, 1996.

Track listing
12", Vinyl
"Welcome" (Radio Edit)(feat. Keith Murray & Aaron Hall)
"Welcome" (Instrumental)
"Welcome" (LP Version)(feat. Keith Murray)
"Do Your Thing" (LP Version)

CD
"Welcome" (LP Version)(feat. Keith Murray)
"Bomdigi" (Remix)
"Do Your Thing" (LP Version)

Chart performance

ol

Personnel

assistant mix engineering – Mike Hogan
co-production – Erick Sermon
mastering – Tony Dawsey
mixing – Troy Hightower
production – Reggie Noble, Rockwilder
vocals – Keith Murray
writing – Reggie Noble, Erick Sermon, Dana Stinson

Notes

1996 singles
Erick Sermon songs
Keith Murray (rapper) songs
Song recordings produced by Rockwilder
Songs written by Rockwilder
Songs written by Erick Sermon
1995 songs
Def Jam Recordings singles